Netherlands competed at the 1960 Summer Paralympics in Rome, Italy. The team included 18 athletes. Competitors from Netherlands won 9 medals, including 3 gold and 6 silver to finish 8th in the medal table.

Medalists

Source: www.paralympic.org & www.olympischstadion.nl

See also

Netherlands at the Paralympics
Netherlands at the 1960 Summer Olympics

References 

Nations at the 1960 Summer Paralympics
1960
Summer Paralympics